Crescent School may refer to:

 Crescent School (Meeker, Oklahoma), in the National Register of Historic Places listings in Oklahoma
 Crescent Elementary School, Sandy, Utah
 Crescent School, Rugby, Warwickshire, England
 Crescent School (Toronto), Toronto, Ontario
 Crescent Convent School, Dildarnagar, Uttar Pradesh, India
 The Crescent School, Topsia, Kolkata